Dinhata subdivision is a subdivision of the Cooch Behar district in the state of West Bengal, India.

Subdivisions
Cooch Behar district is divided into the following administrative subdivisions:

Administrative units
Dinhata subdivision has 2 police stations, 3 community development blocks, 3 panchayat samitis, 33 gram panchayats, 302 mouzas, 300 inhabited villages, 1 municipality and 1 census town. The municipality is: Dinhata. The census town is: Bhangri Pratham Khanda.  The subdivision has its headquarters at Dinhata.

Police stations
Police stations in the Dinhata subdivision have the following features and jurisdiction:

Blocks
Community development blocks in the Dinhata subdivision are:

Gram panchayats
The subdivision contains 33 gram panchayats under 3 community development blocks:

 Dinhata I block consists of 16 gram panchayats, viz. Bara Atia bari–I, Dinhata Village–II, Gosanimari–II, Putimari–I, Bara Atiabari–II, Gitaldaha–I, Matalhat, Putimari–II, Bara Soulmari, Gitaldaha–II, Okrabari, BHETAGURI–I, Dinhata Village–I, Gosanimari–I, Petla and Bhetaguri–II.
 Dinhata II block consists of 12 gram panchayats, viz. Bamanhat–I, –II, Kishamat Dasgram, Sukarukuthi, Bamanhat–II, Chowdhurihat, Najirhat–I, Barasakdal, Gobra Chhara Nayarhat Najirhat–II, Burirhat–I and Sahebganj.
 Sitai block consists of five gram panchayats, viz. Adabari, Chamta, Sitai–II, Brahmottar–Chatra and Sitai–I.

Education
Given in the table below (data in numbers) is a comprehensive picture of the education scenario in Cooch Behar district, with data for the year 2012–13.

Note: Primary schools include junior basic schools; middle schools, high schools and higher secondary schools include madrasahs; technical schools include junior technical schools, junior government polytechnics, industrial technical institutes, industrial training centres, nursing training institutes etc.; technical and professional colleges include engineering colleges, medical colleges, para-medical institutes, management colleges, teachers training and nursing training colleges, law colleges, art colleges, music colleges etc. Special and non-formal education centres include sishu siksha kendras, madhyamik siksha kendras, centres of Rabindra mukta vidyalaya, recognised Sanskrit tols, institutions for the blind and other handicapped persons, Anganwadi centres, reformatory schools etc.

Educational institution
The following institution is located in Dinhata subdivision:
Dinhata College was established in 1956 at Dinhata.

Healthcare
The table below (all data in numbers) presents an overview of the medical facilities available and patients treated in the hospitals, health centres and sub-centres in 2013 in Cooch Behar district, with data for the year 2012–13.:

.* Excluding nursing homes.

Medical facilities
Medical facilities in the Dinhata subdivision are as follows:

Hospitals: (Name, location, beds) 
Dinhata Subdivisional Hospital, Dinhata M, 180 beds

Rural Hospitals: (Name, CD block, location, beds) 
Bamanhat Rural Hospital, Dinhata II CD block, Bamanhat, 30 beds
Sitai Rural Hospital, Sitai CD block, Sitaihat, 30 beds

Block Primary Health Centres: (Name, CD block, location, beds)
Gosanimari Block Primary Health Centre, Dinhata I CD block, Gosanimari, 30 beds

Primary Health Centres : (CD block-wise)(CD block, PHC location, beds)
Dinhata I CD block: Okrabari (6)
Dinhata II CD block: Kisamath (Dasgram) (4), Tharaikhana (2), Nayerhat (10), Najirkhana (6)
Sitai CD block: Nakarjan (4), Adabari (PO Kisamat Adabari) (4)

Legislative segments
As per order of the Delimitation Commission in respect of the delimitation of constituencies in the West Bengal, the Dinhata municipality, Dinhata–II block and Bhetaguri–I, Dinhata Village–I, Dinhata Village–II and Putimari–I gram panchayats of Dinhata–I block together will constitute the Dinhata assembly constituency of West Bengal. The other twelve gram panchayats of Dinhata–I block, viz. Bara Atiabari–I, Gosanimari–II, Bara Atiabari–II, Gitaldaha–I, Matalhat, Putimari–II, Bara Soulmari, Gitaldaha–II, Okrabari, Gosanimari–I, Petla and Bhetaguri–II will form the Sitai assembly constituency along with the whole area under Sitai block. Sitai constituency will be reserved for Scheduled castes (SC) candidates. Both constituencies will be part of Cooch Behar (Lok Sabha constituency), which will be reserved for SC candidates.

References

Subdivisions of West Bengal
Subdivisions in Cooch Behar district
Cooch Behar district